Superior artery may refer to

 Anterior superior alveolar arteries
 Posterior superior alveolar artery
 Superior alveolar artery (disambiguation)
 Superior cerebellar artery
 Superior epigastric artery
 Superior genicular arteries 
 Superior gluteal artery
 Superior hypophysial artery
 Superior labial artery
 Superior laryngeal artery
 Superior lateral genicular artery
 Superior medial genicular artery
 Superior mesenteric artery
 Superior pancreaticoduodenal artery
 Superior phrenic arteries
 Superior rectal artery
 Superior thoracic artery
 Superior thyroid artery
 Superior suprarenal artery
 Superior tympanic artery
 Superior vesical artery